The Man Who Wanted to Live Twice is a 1950 West German drama film directed by Viktor Tourjansky and starring Rudolf Forster, Olga Tschechowa and Heidemarie Hatheyer.

The future star Marianne Koch made her debut in this film, having been discovered by the director while working at the Bavaria Studios in Munich.

The film's sets were designed by the art directors Franz Bi and Botho Hoefer. It was shot at the Bavaria Studios in Munich.

Cast
 Rudolf Forster as Professor Hesse
 Olga Tschechowa as Irene Hesse
 Heidemarie Hatheyer as Maria Monnard
 Ilse Steppat as Oberschwester Hilde
 Rolf von Nauckhoff as Dr. Ihlenfeld
 Helmuth Rudolph as Lorheden
 Dieter Suchsland as Kai Hesse
 Marianne Koch as Katja Hesse
 Joseph Offenbach
 Peter Lühr
 Gunnar Möller
 Wastl Witt
 Helga Lehn
 Dieter von der Recke

References

Bibliography 
 Hans-Michael Bock and Tim Bergfelder. The Concise Cinegraph: An Encyclopedia of German Cinema. Berghahn Books, 2009.

External links 
 

1950 films
1950 drama films
German drama films
West German films
1950s German-language films
Films directed by Victor Tourjansky
Bavaria Film films
Films shot at Bavaria Studios
German black-and-white films
1950s German films